Armin van Buuren is a Dutch DJ and record producer.

Albums

Studio albums

Remix albums

Compilation albums

DJ mixes 
 1999 United (CD) [United]
 1999 Artist Profile Series 4: Boundaries of Imagination (CD) [Black Hole]
 2000 TranceMatch (CD) (as System F vs. Armin) [Cutting Edge]
 2000 001 A State of Trance (2xCD) [United]
 2001 002 Basic Instinct (2xCD) [United]
 2001 003 In Motion (2xCD) [United]
 2002 004 Transparence (2xCD) [United]
 2004 Big Room Trance (CD) [Mixmag]
 2008 Live at the Gallery, Ministry of Sound (CD) [Mixmag]
 2008 Armin Only: Imagine – The Music (only digital download) [Armada Music]
 2008 Armin Only – Imagine (Limited Edition) (3xCD + DVD) (armin only imagine audio live (3xcd) + armin only imagine video live (dvd)) [Armada Music]
 2009 Raveline Mix Sessions 014 (digital)
 2011 Armin Only: Mirage – The Music (only digital download) [Armada Music]
 2011 A State of Trance 500 (5xCD. Mixed by Armin van Buuren, Paul Oakenfold, Markus Schulz, Cosmic Gate and Andy Moor) [Armada Music]
 2012 A State of Trance 550 – Invasion (5xCD. Mixed by Armin van Buuren, Dash Berlin, John O'Callaghan, Arty and Ørjan Nilsen) [Armada Music]
 2013 A State of Trance 600 – The Expedition (5xCD. Mixed by Armin van Buuren, ATB, W&W, Rank 1 and Andrew Rayel) [Armada Music]
 2014 A State of Trance 650 – New Horizons (5xCD. Mixed by Armin van Buuren, BT, Aly & Fila, Kyau & Albert and Omnia) [Armada Music]
 2014 Armin Only – Intense (The Most Intense Edition) (4xCD + DVD) (intense (cd) + more intense (cd) + armin only intense audio live (2xcd) + armin only intense video live & the road movie (dvd)) [Armada Music]
 2015 Armin Only: Intense – The Music (only digital download) [Armada Music]
 2021 A State of Trance 1000 – Celebration Mix (2xCD) [Armada Music]

A State of Trance series 
 2004 A State of Trance 2004 (2xCD) [Armada Music]
 2005 A State of Trance 2005 (2xCD) [Armada Music]
 2006 A State of Trance 2006 (2xCD) [Armada Music]
 2007 A State of Trance 2007 (2xCD) [Armada Music]
 2008 A State of Trance 2008 (2xCD) [Armada Music]
 2009 A State of Trance 2009 (2xCD) [Armada Music]
 2010 A State of Trance 2010 (2xCD) [Armada Music]
 2011 A State of Trance 2011 (2xCD) [Armada Music]
 2012 A State of Trance 2012 (2xCD) [Armada Music]
 2013 A State of Trance 2013 (2xCD) [Armada Music]
 2014 A State of Trance 2014 (2xCD) [Armada Music]
 2015 A State of Trance 2015 (2xCD) [Armada Music]
 2016 A State of Trance 2016 (2xCD) [Armada Music]
 2017 A State of Trance 2017 (2xCD) [Armada Music]
 2018 A State of Trance 2018 (2xCD) [Armada Music]
 2019 A State of Trance 2019 (2xCD) [Armada Music]
 2020 A State of Trance 2020 (2xCD) [Armada Music]
 2021 A State of Trance 2021 (2xCD) [Armada Music]
 2022 A State of Trance 2022 (2xCD) [Armada Music]

A State of Trance Year Mix series 
 2005 A State of Trance Year Mix 2005 (2xCD) [Armada Music]
 2006 A State of Trance Year Mix 2006 (2xCD) [Armada Music]
 2007 A State of Trance Year Mix 2007 (2xCD) [Armada Music]
 2008 A State of Trance Year Mix 2008 (2xCD) [Armada Music]
 2009 A State of Trance Year Mix 2009 (2xCD) [Armada Music]
 2010 A State of Trance Year Mix 2010 (2xCD) [Armada Music]
 2011 A State of Trance Year Mix 2011 (2xCD) [Armada Music]
 2012 A State of Trance Year Mix 2012 (2xCD) [Armada Music]
 2013 A State of Trance Year Mix 2013 (2xCD) [Armada Music]
 2014 A State of Trance Year Mix 2004 (2xCD) [Armada Music] (released in double CD 10 years after)
 2014 A State of Trance Year Mix 2014 (2xCD) [Armada Music]
 2015 A State of Trance Year Mix 2015 (2xCD) [Armada Music]
 2016 A State of Trance Year Mix 2016 (2xCD) [Armada Music]
 2017 A State of Trance Year Mix 2017 (2xCD) [Armada Music]
 2018 A State of Trance Year Mix 2018 (2xCD) [Armada Music]
 2019 A State of Trance Year Mix 2019 (2xCD) [Armada Music]
 2020 A State of Trance Year Mix 2020 (2xCD) [Armada Music]
 2021 A State of Trance Year Mix 2021 (2xCD) [Armada Music]
 2022 A State of Trance Year Mix 2022 (2xCD) [Armada Music]

Universal Religion series 
 2003 Universal Religion Chapter 1 (CD) [Armada Music]
 2004 Universal Religion Chapter 2 (CD) [Armada Music]
 2007 Universal Religion Chapter 3 (CD) [Armada Music]
 2009 Universal Religion Chapter 4 (CD) [Armada Music]
 2011 Universal Religion Chapter 5 (2xCD) [Armada Music]
 2012 Universal Religion Chapter 6 (2xCD) [Armada Music]
 2013 Universal Religion Chapter 7 (2xCD) [Armada Music]

Ibiza series 
 2014 A State of Trance Ibiza 2014 at Ushuaïa (2xCD) [Armada Music]
 2015 A State of Trance Ibiza 2015 at Ushuaïa (2xCD) [Armada Music]
 2016 A State of Trance Ibiza 2016 (2xCD) [Armada Music]
 2017 A State of Trance Ibiza 2017 (2xCD) [Armada Music]
 2018 A State of Trance Ibiza 2018 (2xCD) [Armada Music]
 2019 A State of Trance Ibiza 2019 (2xCD) [Armada Music]
 2020 A State of Trance Ibiza 2020 [Armada Music]
 2022 A State of Trance Ibiza 2022 (2xCD) [Armada Music]

Video albums 
 2005 Armin Only – The Next Level (DVD) [Armada Music]
 2007 Armin Only – Ahoy' 2006 (2xDVD) [Armada Music]
 2008 Armin Only – Imagine (2xDVD) [Armada Music]
 2009 The Music Videos 1997–2009 (DVD + CD) [Armada Music]
 2010 Armin Only – Mirage (DVD) [Armada Music]
 2012 A Year with Armin van Buuren (DVD) [Armada Music]
 2014 Armin Only – Intense (The Most Intense Edition) (4xCD + DVD) (intense (cd) + more intense (cd) + armin only intense audio live (2xcd) + armin only intense video live & the road movie (dvd)) [Armada Music]

Extended plays

Singles

1990s

2000s

2010s

2020s

Promotional singles

Alias 
Alibi (with Tiësto)
DJ's United (with Paul van Dyk & Paul Oakenfold)
Gaia (with Benno De Goeij)
Gimmick
Major League (with Tiësto)
Perpetuous Dreamer
Rising Star
Triple A

Remixes

As lead artist

Club, VIP, Festival Mixes and other versions to his own songs 

 Armin van Buuren & Fernando Garibay feat. Olaf Blackwood - «I Need You» (Club Mix)
 Armin van Buuren & Fernando Garibay feat. Olaf Blackwood - «I Need You» [Miami Edit]
 Armin van Buuren feat. Sharon den Adel - «In and Out of Love» (2017 Revision)
 Armin van Buuren - «Orbion» (2017 Revision)
 Armin van Buuren vs Human Resource - «Dominator» (Festival Mix)
 Armin van Buuren feat. Josh Cumbee - «Sunny Days» (Club Mix)

 Armin van Buuren Feat. Conrad Sewell - «Sex, Love & Water» (Club Mix)
 Armin van Buuren Feat. James Newman - «Therapy» (Club Mix)
 Armin van Buuren feat. Sam Martin - «Wild Wild Son» (Club Mix)
 Armin van Buuren feat. Bonnie McKee - «Lonely for You» (Club Mix)
 Armin van Buuren x Lucas & Steve feat. Josh Cumbee - «Don't Give Up on Me» (Club Mix)
 Armin van Buuren x Lucas & Steve feat. Josh Cumbee - «Don't Give Up on Me» (Trance Mix)
 Armin van Buuren & Garibay - «Phone Down» (Club Mix)
 Armin van Buuren & Luke Bond feat. Karra - «Revolution» (Side-and-Chain Cinematic Intro Version)
 Armin van Buuren feat. Cimo Fränkel - «All Comes Down» (Acoustic Version)
 Armin van Buuren feat. Ne-Yo - «Unlove You» (Club Mix)

 Armin van Buuren & Fatum - «Punisher» (Side-and-Chain Cinematic Intro Version)
 Armin van Buuren & Avian Grays feat. Jordan Shaw - «Something Real» (Acoustic Version)
 Armin van Buuren & Brennan Heart feat. Andreas Moe - «All On Me» (Acoustic Version)
 Armin van Buuren & Fatum vs Armin van Buuren & Brennan Heart & Andreas Moe - «Punisher» vs «All On Me» (Armin van Buuren Mashup)
 Dimitri Vegas & Like Mike x Armin van Buuren x Brennan Heart ft. Jeremy Oceans - «Christmas Time» (Live Acoustic)
 Dimitri Vegas & Like Mike x Armin van Buuren x Brennan Heart ft. Jeremy Oceans - «Christmas Time» (Instrumental)

 Alesso & Armin van Buuren - «Leave a Little Love» (Club Mix)
 Armin van Buuren feat. RBVLN - «Weight of the World» (Club Mix)
 Armin van Buuren & Davina Michelle - «Hold On» (Club Mix)
 Armin van Buuren & Sam Gray - «Human Touch» (Club Mix)
 Armin van Buuren & R3HAB feat. Simon Ward - «Love We Lost» (VIP Mix)
 Armin van Buuren feat. Wrabel - «Feel Again» (Club Mix)
 Armin van Buuren & Wildstylez feat. PollyAnna - «Typically Ducth» (VIP Mix)
 Armin van Buuren & Matoma feat. Teddy Swims - «Easy To Love» (Armin van Buuren Club Mix)

As Rising Star 
 Tiësto and Armin van Buuren presents Alibi – "Eternity" (Armin van Buuren's Rising Star Mix) 
 Ayumi Hamasaki – "Appears" (Armin van Buuren's Rising Star 12" Instr. Mix) / (Armin van Buuren's Rising Star Vocal Mix) / (Armin van Buuren's Rising Star Remix)
 Armin van Buuren featuring Susana – "Shivers" (Rising Star Mix) 
 CJ Stone – "Shining Star" (Rising Star Mix)
 Armin van Buuren featuring Ray Wilson – "Yet Another Day" (Rising Star Mix)
 Gouryella – "Walhalla" (Armin van Buuren's Rising Star Mix) / (Armin van Buuren's Rising Star Dub)
 DJ Manta – "Holding On" (Armin van Buuren's Rising Star Mix)
 Jean-Michel Jarre and Armin van Buuren – "Stardust" (Rising Star Remix)
 Armin van Buuren and Avalan – "Should I Wait" (Rising Star Remix)
 Airscape – "L'Esperanza" (Armin van Buuren's Rising Star Mix)
 Armin van Buuren presents Perpetuous Dreamer - "The Sound Of Goodbye" (Rising Star Remix)
Armin van Buuren and Susana - Home With You (Rising Star Remix)
 Armin van Buuren presents Perpetuous Dreamer - "Dust.Wav" (Rising Star Remix)
 CJ Stone - "Shining Star" (Rising Star Remix)
 Armin van Buuren featuring Justine Suissa - "Burned With Desire" (Rising Star Remix)

Productions

Production and songwriting credits

Notes

References

External links 
Armin van Buuren @ Top 40 charts.com

Discography
Discographies of Dutch artists
Electronic music discographies
Production discographies